Jesús Jiménez Núñez (born 5 November 1993) is a Spanish professional footballer who plays as a forward for Major League Soccer club FC Dallas.

Club career
Born in Leganés, Jiménez graduated from the academy of CD Leganés. After having spent two seasons with the reserves, he went on to represent AD Unión Adarve, AD Alcorcón B, Atlético Pinto in Tercera División.

On 18 July 2015, Jiménez joined newly promoted club CD Illescas. After having scored 15 goals in 36 matches, he switched to fellow club CF Talavera de la Reina on 30 June 2016. On 27 November, he scored four goals in a 5–0 victory against his former club Illescas. He scored 26 league goals in his first season with his club winning promotion to Segunda División B. On 6 September 2017, he scored twice in a 3–1 Copa del Rey victory against Antequera CF.

On 1 June 2018,  Jiménez moved abroad and joined Polish club Górnik Zabrze on a three-year contract. On 12 July, he made his first team debut, starting in a 1–0 win against Moldovan club Zaria Bălți in the UEFA Europa League qualifiers. In his second season, he scored 12 goals and compatriot teammate Igor Angulo scored 16. He recorded the same figures in 2020–21, including a hat-trick on the opening day in a 4–2 home win over Podbeskidzie Bielsko-Biała.

On 7 February 2022, Jiménez signed with Major League Soccer club Toronto FC on an initial two-and-a-half year deal. He made his debut on 26 February in the season opener against FC Dallas. He scored his first goal in the next match on 5 March, in a 4-1 loss against the New York Red Bulls.

In February 2023, ahead of the 2023 MLS season, he was traded to FC Dallas in exchange for Brandon Servania.

Career statistics

Honours
Toronto FC
Canadian Championship: 2020

Individual
Ekstraklasa Player of the Month: August 2020

References

External links

1993 births
Living people
People from Leganés
Association football forwards
Spanish footballers
Footballers from the Community of Madrid
Segunda División B players
Tercera División players
CD Leganés B players
AD Alcorcón B players
CF Talavera de la Reina players
Ekstraklasa players
Górnik Zabrze players
Toronto FC players
FC Dallas players
Spanish expatriate footballers
Spanish expatriates in Poland
Expatriate footballers in Poland
Spanish expatriate sportspeople in Canada
Major League Soccer players